Music from the Motion Picture New Jack City is the original soundtrack to Mario Van Peebles' 1991 film New Jack City. It was released by Giant Records through Reprise Records, and distributed by Warner Bros. Records. The soundtrack consists of eleven original songs, most of which were performed by chart-topping R&B and hip-hop artists of the time. The music is heavily influenced by the New Jack Swing genre of R&B. Prominent artists and producers of this sound contributed to the soundtrack, including Guy with Teddy Riley, Keith Sweat, Color Me Badd, and Johnny Gill; Al B. Sure! produced the track "Get It Together (Black Is a Force)," performed by F.S. Effect.

The soundtrack reached No. 1 on the US Billboard Top R&B/Hip-Hop Albums chart for eight weeks, and No. 2 on the Billboard 200. The single "I'm Dreamin'," performed by Christopher Williams, and "For the Love of Money/Living for the City," performed by Troop, LeVert, and Queen Latifah, reached No. 1 and No. 12 on the Billboard Hot R&B/Hip-Hop Songs chart, respectively.

The Troop/LeVert/Queen Latifah song was a medley of The O'Jays' "For the Love of Money" and Stevie Wonder's "Living for the City" (The O'Jays' lead singer is Eddie Levert, the father of two members of the group LeVert).

Track listing

Personnel
 Doug McHenry — executive producer
 George Jackson — executive producer
 Benny Medina — executive producer
 Cassandra Mills — executive producer
 Teddy Riley — producer, arranger
 Bernard Belle - producer

Charts

Singles

See also
List of number-one R&B albums of 1991 (U.S.)

References

External links 

1991 soundtrack albums
Hip hop soundtracks
Contemporary R&B soundtracks
Giant Records (Warner) soundtracks
Albums produced by DJ Aladdin
Albums produced by Teddy Riley
Action film soundtracks